Kyle Hunter Martino (born February 19, 1981) is an American former professional soccer player who spent seven seasons with the Columbus Crew and Los Angeles Galaxy in Major League Soccer as a midfielder and is currently a television soccer analyst and host.

Career

High school
Martino attended Staples High School in Westport, Connecticut, where he played soccer and was named Gatorade National Player of the Year in 1998 after his senior season.

College
Martino attended the University of Virginia from 1999 to 2001.  He played college soccer and scored 17 goals and provided 21 assists.  In his junior season, Martino was named ACC Player of the Year. In both his sophomore and junior seasons, he was one of 15 finalists for the Hermann Trophy.

Professional
Martino left UVA after his junior season, signing a Project-40 contract with Major League Soccer (MLS) and entering the 2002 MLS Superdraft, where the Columbus Crew selected him eighth overall.  He tallied 2 goals and 5 assists in 22 appearances and won the MLS Rookie of the Year Award, while running the Crew offense for much of the season.   His following season was something of a disappointment, as Martino failed to develop into the dominant offensive force that many had expected, although he maintained a spot in the Crew's starting lineup.  His third season began like the second with Martino failing to stimulate the offense, but a move up to withdrawn forward saw a resurgence of his offensive abilities, and through the 2004 season Martino led the Crew to the longest unbeaten streak in MLS history. Martino had a down year in 2005, not scoring a goal. In early 2006, Martino was dealt to the LA Galaxy in a four-player deal. He and John Wolyniec were traded for Joseph Ngwenya and Ned Grabavoy. During the first 2006 match between the Crew and the Galaxy, before the trade, it was Martino who, in the last few seconds, scored the game's only goal, delivering a defeat to his soon-to-be teammates.

In November 2006, Martino had a trial at Dutch Eredivisie side NEC Nijmegen, but did not earn a contract.  Martino also had a trial at Leeds United.

Martino retired from professional soccer on February 19, 2008, having been advised by doctors that injuries he sustained throughout his career were severe enough that it would be in his best interest to retire.

International
Martino played for the United States at the 2001 World Youth Championship in Argentina. He saw little playing time for the senior national team, getting his first cap on November 17, 2002, against El Salvador. He scored his only international goal against Panama on October 12, 2005, in a 2-0 World Cup qualifier U.S. victory.

Post-playing career
Until the beginning of the 2020/21 season, Martino was a studio analyst and color commentator for NBC Sports coverage of the English Premier League. He was previously a color commentator for MLS on the ESPN family of networks. In addition to commentating, he is also a television host featured on Travel Channel's 36 Hours and NBC's Spartan Race.

On November 6, 2017, Martino announced he was leaving NBC Sports temporarily to stand as a candidate for president of the United States Soccer Federation in the February 2018 election. His campaign was unsuccessful.

Career statistics

Honors
Columbus Crew
Lamar Hunt U.S. Open Cup: 2002
MLS Supporters' Shield: 2004

Individual
MLS Rookie of the Year: 2002

Personal life 
Martino married actress Eva Amurri on October 29, 2011. They have three children, a daughter, Marlowe and two sons, Major and Mateo.

On November 15, 2019, the couple announced that they were separating. As of March 2020, the couple have finalized their divorce before welcoming their third child.

References

1981 births
Living people
American soccer players
American people of Italian descent
Columbus Crew players
LA Galaxy players
2003 FIFA Confederations Cup players
Virginia Cavaliers men's soccer players
Major League Soccer broadcasters
Major League Soccer players
Major League Soccer All-Stars
Columbus Crew draft picks
United States men's under-20 international soccer players
United States men's under-23 international soccer players
United States men's international soccer players
Soccer players from Atlanta
Association football midfielders
All-American men's college soccer players
Staples High School alumni